KBFL may refer to:

 the ICAO code for Meadows Field Airport
 KBFL (AM), a radio station (1060 AM) licensed to Springfield, Missouri, United States
 KBFL-FM, a radio station (99.9 FM) licensed to Fair Grove, Missouri